Ivar A. Mjør (18 September 1933 – 6 January 2017) was a Norwegian odontologist.

Mjør was born in Norderhov. He was professor in dentistry at the University of Oslo, director of Nordisk Institutt for odontologisk materialprøving, president of the International Association for Dental Research, and professor at the University of Florida College of Dentistry. He published more than 300 scientific articles during his career.

References

1933 births
2017 deaths
People from Ringerike (municipality)
Norwegian dentists
Academic staff of the University of Oslo
20th-century dentists